Selten is a surname. Notable people with the surname include:

Morton Selten (1860–1939), English actor
Reinhard Selten (1930–2016), German economist